Americas Quarterly (AQ) is a publication dedicated to politics, business and culture in the Americas.

Distribution
AQ has an established relationship with NTN24, an online news channel from Colombia with three million viewers, to broadcast stories on topics from Americas Quarterly. Topics from AQ are also discussed on NTN’s program , with host Moisés Naím.

Editorial board
 Mauricio Cárdenas Santamaría
 Fernando Henrique Cardoso
 Isabel Saint Malo
 Javier Corrales
 Monica de Bolle
 Ricardo Lagos
 Richard Lapper
 Stephanie Leutert
 Eduardo Levy Yeyati
 Valeria Moy
 Moisés Naím
 Patricio Navia
 Gray Newman
 Shannon O'Neil
 Thomas Shannon
 Ilona Szabó
 Eugene Zapata-Garesché
 Ernesto Zedillo

Columnists and guest writers
 Joe Biden
 Brendan O'Boyle
 Brian Winter
 Geovanny Vicente
 Stephen G. McFarland
 Vanessa Rubio Márquez

The Capacity to Combat Corruption(CCC) Index
In 2019, the Americas Society/Council of the Americas (AS/COA) and Control Risks, the consulting firm specializing in global risks, present the publication of the Anti-Corruption Capacity Index (CCC),6​ an analytical tool based on data to assess the ability of Latin American countries to uncover, punish, and stop corruption.

"The Index shows in detail how the anti-corruption wave that was advancing in Latin America a few years ago has lost steam and, in some places, is receding dangerously. What is even more worrying: this is happening while COVID-19 is increasing the risk of corruption throughout the region,” said Roberto Simón, senior director of public policy at AS/COA.7

The CCC Index looks at 14 key variables, including the independence of judicial institutions, the strength of investigative journalism, and the level of resources available to combat white-collar crime. The Index is based on extensive data and a proprietary survey conducted among Control Risks' leading anti-corruption experts, academia, civil society, the media and the private sector.

Social Inclusion Index
AQ's annual Social Inclusion Index, which was published between 2012 and 2016, evaluated 17 countries on across 21 variables including access to public and private goods, popular attitudes toward empowerment and government responsiveness, and the protection of basic civil, political, and human, and disability rights as well as access to justice. The Index tracked social inclusion within and across countries over the long-term, addressing the multiple dimensions of social inclusion. 

The 2014 Social Inclusion Index generated press coverage both in the U.S. and throughout Latin America.

References

External links 
 

Political magazines published in the United States
Quarterly magazines published in the United States
English-language magazines
Magazines established in 2007
Magazines published in New York City